Jeffrey Richard "J. J." Jansen (born January 20, 1986) is an American football long snapper for the Carolina Panthers of the National Football League (NFL). He holds the record for the most games played by a Panther with 222, set in Week 14 of 2022 against the Seahawks. He was signed by the Green Bay Packers as an undrafted free agent in 2008, but was never able to play a single football game as a Packer. He played college football at Notre Dame.

Early life
Jansen attended high school at Brophy College Preparatory in Phoenix, Arizona.  He attended Rancho Solano Private School prior to that, where he starred as Quarterback, leading the RSPS Mustangs to an MVAL championship in 1999.

Professional career

Green Bay Packers
After going unselected in the 2008 NFL Draft, Jansen signed with the Green Bay Packers.

Carolina Panthers
The Packers traded Jansen to the Carolina Panthers for a conditional pick in the 2011 NFL Draft on April 13, 2009. On February 8, 2012, the Panthers re-signed him to a four-year contract worth roughly $3.6 million.
On January 15, 2014, it was announced that he would be one of seven Carolina Panthers players  to be voted into the 2014 Pro Bowl. It would be Jansen's first Pro Bowl nomination.

On February 7, 2016, Jansen was part of the Panthers team that played in Super Bowl 50. In the game, the Panthers fell to the Denver Broncos by a score of 24–10.

On February 17, 2016, the Panthers signed Jansen to a five-year, $5.5 million contract extension.

In Week 3 of the 2020 NFL season against the Los Angeles Chargers, Jansen recovered a punt at the Chargers' one-yard-line near the end of the fourth quarter. The Chargers failed their winning drive by less than 25 yards, the length of a touchback.

On March 17, 2021, Jansen re-signed with the Panthers on a one-year contract.

On February 9, 2022, Jansen signed a one-year contract extension with the Panthers.

On November 27, 2022, Jansen tied former longtime Panthers kicker John Kasay for most games played for the franchise (221).

Jansen signed a one-year contract extension on February 20, 2023.

References

External links
Carolina Panthers bio
Notre Dame Fighting Irish bio

1986 births
Living people
American football long snappers
Notre Dame Fighting Irish football players
Green Bay Packers players
Carolina Panthers players
Unconferenced Pro Bowl players
Players of American football from Phoenix, Arizona